The Florida Complex League Cardinals are a Rookie-level affiliate of the St. Louis Cardinals, competing in the Florida Complex League of Minor League Baseball. Prior to 2021, the team was known as the Gulf Coast League Cardinals. The team plays its home games in Jupiter, Florida, at Roger Dean Stadium, which is also the spring training home of the St. Louis Cardinals and the Miami Marlins. The team is mainly composed of players who are in their first year of professional baseball either as draftees or non-drafted free agents.

History
The team first competed in the Sarasota Rookie League in 1964 and the Florida Rookie League in 1965, predecessors of the Gulf Coast League (GCL), which began play in 1966. The team competed until 1976, then was absent from the league for 30 years.

In 2007, the team returned to the GCL, and has operated continuously since then. The team claimed its first league championship in 2016. Prior to the 2021 season, the Gulf Coast League was renamed as the Florida Complex League.

Season by season

Roster

References

External links
 Official website

Baseball teams established in 1964
Florida Complex League teams
Professional baseball teams in Florida
Sports in the Miami metropolitan area
St. Louis Cardinals minor league affiliates
1964 establishments in Florida